Michel Bataille (March 25, 1926February 28, 2008) was a French writer.

Biography
Bataille studied architecture at École nationale supérieure des beaux-arts, and took part in projects with Le Corbusier. Thirteen years later, he left architecture due to deafness problems, and devoted himself to writing. Living in Paris, and then in Saint Cloud, he ultimately chose Normandy to settle with his family, consisting of his wife, painter Marie Claude, and his children Frédéric, Eric, Emmanuelle, and Nicolas.

In 1947, he won the Stendhal Prize for his first novel, Patrick, and in 1950, after the publication of La Marche du Soleil (written during a trip to Africa), he temporarily stopped writing.

His job as an architect inspired him to write A Pyramid on the Sea in 1965, and La ville des fous in 1966. He was a guest of Bernard Pivot and Jacques Chancel on several occasions. His novel The Christmas Tree qualified in the first two rounds of the Prix Goncourt, but was eliminated in the third round of voting. The book was later turned into a film by Terence Young in 1969, with Bourvil in the main role.

His novel Une anger Blanche is the story of a painter in all his creativity and suffering (Prize of the Four Juries). Cendres sur la mer, went against the grain of the times by presenting abortion as a tragedy.

He also published books on Jean Jaurès and Gilles de Rais.

He was the nephew of Georges Bataille.

Works

 Patrick (winner of the Prix Stendhal in 1947)
 The Sun's Walk (1950)
 The Wild Cat (1960)
 Five Days of Autumn (1963), later adapted for television
 Sky Fire (1964)
 A Pyramid on the Sea (winner of the Prix des Deux Magots in 1965) 
 City of Fools (1966) 
 The Christmas Tree (1967)
 White Wrath (1969)
 The Scream in the Wall (winner of the Jean-Cocteau Prize in 1970)
 The Better Days (winner of the Maison de la Presse Prize in 1974)
 Ashes on the Sea (1975)
 Secret Sun (1975)
 Tomorrow Jaurès (1977)

References

French writers
1926 births
2008 deaths